The 1971 Rhode Island Rams football team was an American football team that represented the University of Rhode Island as a member of the Yankee Conference during the 1971 NCAA College Division football season. In its second season under head coach Jack Gregory, the team compiled a 3–6 record (2–3 against conference opponents), tied for fourth place out of seven teams in the Yankee Conference, and was  outscored by a total of 207 to 154. The team played its home games at Meade Stadium in Kingston, Rhode Island.

Schedule

References

Rhode Island
Rhode Island Rams football seasons
Rhode Island Rams football